Dana Plotogea (born 30 September 1981) is a Romanian biathlete. She represented Romania at the 2002 Winter Olympics, the 2006 Winter Olympics, and the 2010 Winter Olympics in Vancouver.

References

External links

1981 births
Living people
Romanian female biathletes
Olympic biathletes of Romania
Biathletes at the 2002 Winter Olympics
Biathletes at the 2006 Winter Olympics
Biathletes at the 2010 Winter Olympics